The 2008 North Indian Ocean cyclone season officially ran throughout the year during 2008, with the first depression forming on April 27. The timeline includes information that was not operationally released, meaning that information from post-storm reviews by the Joint Typhoon Warning Center (JTWC), and the India Meteorological Department (IMD), such as information on a storm that was not operationally warned on. This timeline documents all the storm formations, strengthening, weakening, landfalls, extratropical transitions, as well as dissipation's during the 2008 North Indian Ocean cyclone season.

During the year, 10 tropical depressions, 4 Cyclonic storms and 1 Severe Cyclonic storm formed. The scope of this basin is north of the Equator and west of the Malaysian Peninsula. The India Meteorological Department (IMD) and Joint Typhoon Warning Center (JTWC) monitor tropical cyclones in this basin. This basin is divided into two different seas by the IMD; the Arabian Sea to the west of India, which is abbreviated as ARB by the IMD, and the Bay of Bengal to the east of India, which is abbreviated as BOB by the IMD.

Timeline of storms

April
26 April
18:00 UTC (11:30 p.m. IST) – The Joint Typhoon Warning Center (JTWC) reports that Tropical Depression 01B has formed roughly 765 km (465 mi) east of Chennai, Tamil Nadu.
27 April
03:00 UTC (8:30 a.m. IST) – The India Meteorological Department (IMD) designates Tropical Depression 01B as a depression.
12:00 UTC (5:30 p.m. IST) – The IMD reports that Depression BOB 01 (01B), has intensified into a deep depression.
12:00 UTC (5:30 p.m. IST) – The JTWC reports that Tropical Depression 01B has intensified into a tropical storm.
28 April
00:00 UTC (5:30 a.m. IST) – The IMD reports that Deep Depression BOB 01 (01B), has intensified into a cyclonic storm and names it "Nargis".
06:00 UTC (11:30 a.m. IST) – The JTWC reports that Tropical Storm Nargis (01B), has intensified into a category 1 tropical cyclone.
09:00 UTC (2:30 p.m. IST) – The IMD reports that Cyclonic Storm Nargis (01B), has intensified into a severe cyclonic storm.
29 April
03:00 UTC (8:30 a.m. IST) – The IMD reports that Severe Cyclonic Storm Nargis (01B), has intensified into a very severe cyclonic storm.
30 April
06:00 UTC (11:30 a.m. IST) – The JTWC reports that Tropical Cyclone Nargis (01B), has weakened into a tropical storm.
12:00 UTC (5:30 p.m. IST) – The JTWC reports that Tropical Storm Nargis (01B), has re-intensified into a category 1 tropical cyclone.

May

1 May
12:00 UTC (5:30 pm. IST) – The JTWC reports that Tropical Cyclone Nargis (01B), has intensified into a category 3 tropical cyclone.
2 May
03:00 UTC (8:30 a.m. IST) – The IMD reports that Very Severe Cyclonic Storm Nargis (01B), has intensified into an extremely severe cyclonic storm.
06:00 UTC (11:30 a.m. IST) – The JTWC reports that Tropical Cyclone Nargis has intensified into a category 4 tropical cyclone.
12:00 – 14:00 UTC (5:30 – 7:30 p.m.
18:00 UTC (11:30 p.m. IST) – The IMD reports that Extremely Severe Cyclonic Storm Nargis (01B), has weakened into a very severe cyclonic storm.
18:00 UTC (11:30 p.m. IST) – The JTWC reports that Tropical Cyclone Nargis (01B), has weakened into a category 2 tropical cyclone.
21:00 UTC (2:30 a.m. IST, 3 May) – The IMD reports that Very Severe Cyclonic Storm Nargis (01B), has weakened into a severe cyclonic storm.
3 May
00:00 UTC (5:30 a.m. IST) – The JTWC reports that Tropical Cyclone Nargis (01B), has weakened into a category 1 tropical cyclone.
06:00 UTC (11:30 a.m. IST) – The IMD reports that Severe Cyclonic Storm Nargis (01B), has weakened into a cyclonic storm.
06:00 UTC (11:30 a.m. IST) – The JTWC reports that Tropical Cyclone Nargis (01B), has weakened into a tropical storm.
12:00 UTC (5:30 p.m. IST) – The IMD reports that Cyclonic Storm Nargis (01B), has degenerated into an area of low pressure while located over eastern Myanmar.
18:00 UTC (11:30 p.m. IST) – The JTWC reports that Tropical Storm Nargis (01B), has weakened into a tropical depression.
4 May 
00:00 UTC (5:30 a.m. IST) – The JTWC reports that Tropical Depression Nargis (01B), has dissipated while located over eastern Myanmar.

June
5 June
00:00 UTC (5:30 a.m. IST) – The IMD reports that Depression ARB 01 has formed roughly 830 km (530 mi) southwest of Mumbai, India.
7 June
00:00 UTC (5:30 a.m. IST) – The IMD reports that Depression ARB 01 has weakened into an area of low pressure while located roughly 480 km (300 mi) southeast of Muscat, Oman.
16 June
03:00 UTC (8:30 a.m. IST) – The IMD reports that Depression BOB 02 has formed roughly 220 km (135 mi) southeast of Kolkata, India.
11:00 – 12:00 UTC (4:30 – 5:30 p.m.
18 June
09:00 UTC (2:30 p.m. IST) – The IMD reports that Depression BOB 02 has weakened into an area of low pressure while located over Jharkhand.

August
9 August
12:00 UTC (5:30 p.m. IST) – The IMD reports that Land Depression BOB 03 has formed over Odisha.
10 August
12:00 UTC (5:30 p.m. IST) – The IMD reports that Land Depression BOB 03 has weakened into an area of low pressure over northern Odisha.

September
15 September
12:00 UTC (5:30 p.m. IST) – The IMD reports that Depression BOB 04 has formed roughly 345 km (215 mi) south of Kolkata, India.
12:00 UTC (5:30 p.m. IST) – The JTWC designates Depression BOB 04 as Tropical Depression 02B.
16 September
06:00 UTC (11:30 a.m. IST) – The IMD reports that Depression BOB 04 (02B), has intensified into a deep depression.
0600 UTC (11:30 a.m. IST) – The JTWC reports that Tropical Depression 02B has intensified into a tropical storm.
16:00 – 17:00 UTC (9:30 – 10:30 p.m.
18:00 UTC (11:30 p.m.
17 September
12:00 UTC (5:30 p.m. IST) – The JTWC reports that Tropical Storm 02B has weakened into a tropical depression.
18 September
09:00 UTC (2:30 p.m. IST) – The IMD reports that Deep Depression BOB 04 (02B), has weakened into a depression.
12:00 UTC (5:30 p.m. IST) – The JTWC reports that Tropical Depression 02B has dissipated while located over Chhattisgarh.
19 September
12:00 UTC (5:30 p.m. IST) – The IMD reports that Depression BOB 04 (02B), has weakened into an area of low pressure over central Uttar Pradesh.

October
19 October
09:00 UTC (2:30 p.m. IST) – The IMD reports that Depression ARB 02 has formed roughly 1,795 km (1,115 mi) northeast of Mogadishu, Somalia.
20 October
06:00 UTC (11:30 a.m. IST) – The JTWC designates Depression ARB 02 as Tropical Depression 03A.
18:00 UTC (11:30 p.m.
21 October
03:00 UTC (8:30 a.m. IST) – The IMD reports that Depression ARB 02 has intensified into a deep depression.
18:00 UTC (11:30 p.m. IST) – Deep Depression ARB 02 makes landfall on the Yemeni island of Socotra at peak intensity with 3-minute sustained wind speeds of 55 mph (35 mph).
22 October
03:00 UTC (8:30 a.m. IST) – The IMD reports that Deep Depression ARB 02 has weakened into a depression.
23 October
03:00 UTC (8:30 a.m. IST) – The IMD reports that Depression ARB 02 has weakened into an area of low pressure while located over the western Arabian Sea.
18:00 UTC (11:30 p.m. IST) – The JTWC reports that Tropical Depression 03A has dissipated while located over the western Arabian Sea.
24 October
18:00 UTC (11:30 p.m. IST) – The JTWC reports that Tropical Depression 04B has formed roughly 370 km (230 mi) southeast of Visakhapatnam, India.
25 October
03:00 UTC (8:30 a.m. IST) – The IMD designates Tropical Depression 04B as Depression BOB 05.
26 October
00:00 UTC (5:30 a.m. IST) – The IMD reports that Depression BOB 05 (04B), has intensified into a deep depression.
00:00 UTC (5:30 a.m. IST) – The JTWC reports that Tropical Depression 04B has intensified into a tropical storm.
12:00 UTC (5:30 p.m. IST) – The IMD reports that Deep Depression BOB 05 (04B), has intensified into a cyclonic storm and names it "Rashmi".
18:00 UTC (11:30 p.m.
21:00 UTC (2:30 a.m.
22:00 – 23:00 UTC (3:30 – 4:30 a.m.
27 October
03:00 UTC (8:30 a.m. IST) – The IMD reports that Cyclonic Storm Rashmi (04B), has weakened into a deep depression.
06:00 UTC (11:30 a.m. IST) – The JTWC reports that Tropical Storm Rashmi (04B), has weakened into a tropical depression and dissipated while located near the Bangladesh – Meghalaya border.
09:00 UTC (2:30 p.m. IST) – The IMD reports that the deep depression, ex-Rashmi (04B), has weakened into an area of low pressure over Meghalaya.

November
13 November
12:00 UTC (5:30 p.m. IST) – The IMD reports that Depression BOB 06 has formed roughly 595 km (370 mi) southeast of Chennai, India.
12:00 UTC (5:30 p.m. IST) – The JTWC designates Depression BOB 06 as Tropical Depression 05B.
14 November
00:00 UTC (5:30 a.m. IST) – The JTWC reports that Tropical Depression 05B has intensified into a tropical storm.
03:00 UTC (8:30 a.m. IST) – The IMD reports that Depression BOB 06 (05B), has intensified into a deep depression.
12:00 UTC (5:30 p.m. IST) – The IMD reports that Deep Depression BOB 06 (05B), has intensified into a cyclonic storm and names it Khai-Muk.
12:00 UTC (5:30 p.m.
21:00 UTC (2:30 a.m.
15 November
06:00 UTC (11:30 a.m. IST) – The IMD reports that Cyclonic Storm Khai-Muk (05B), has weakened into a deep depression.
22:00 – 2300 UTC (3:30 – 4:30 a.m.
16 November
03:00 UTC (8:30 a.m. IST) – The IMD reports that the deep depression, ex-Khai-Muk (05B), has weakened into a depression.
06:00 UTC (11:30 a.m. IST) – The JTWC reports that Tropical Storm Khai-Muk (05B), has weakened into a tropical depression and dissipated over southern Andhra Pradesh.
09:00 UTC (2:30 p.m. IST) – The IMD reports that the depression, ex-Khai-Muk (05B), has weakened into an area of low pressure over Rayalaseema and Telangana.
25 November
09:00 UTC (2:30 p.m. IST) – The IMD reports that Depression BOB 07 has formed over northern Sri Lanka.
12:00 UTC (5:30 p.m. IST) – The IMD reports that Depression BOB 07 has intensified into a deep depression.
26 November
03:00 UTC (8:30 a.m. IST) – The IMD reports that Deep Depression BOB 07 has intensified into a cyclonic storm and names it "Nisha".
09:00 UTC (2:30 p.m.
27 November
00:00 – 01:00 UTC (5:30 – 6:30 a.m.
09:00 UTC (2:30 p.m. IST) – The IMD reports that Cyclonic Storm Nisha has weakened into a deep depression.
12:00 UTC (5:30 p.m. IST) – The IMD reports that the deep depression, ex-Nisha, has weakened into a depression.
28 November
00:00 UTC (5:30 a.m. IST) – The IMD reports that the depression, ex-Nisha, has weakened into an area of low pressure over northern Tamil Nadu.

December
4 December
03:00 UTC (8:30 a.m. IST) – The IMD reports that Depression BOB 08 has formed roughly 635 km (395 mi) northwest of Banda Aceh, Indonesia.
5 December
00:00 UTC (5:30 a.m. IST) – The IMD reports that Depression BOB 08 has intensified into a deep depression.
7 December
00:00 UTC (5:30 a.m. IST) – The IMD reports that Deep Depression BOB 08 has weakened into a depression.
15:00 UTC (8:30 p.m. IST) – The IMD reports that Depression BOB 08 has weakened into an area of low pressure over Sri Lanka.

See also

2008 North Indian Ocean cyclone season
North Indian Ocean tropical cyclone

Notes

References

External links
India Meteorological Department
Joint Typhoon Warning Center 

2008 North Indian Ocean cyclone season
North Indian Ocean meteorological timelines
2008 NIO T
NIO T